Ledikeni or Lady Kenny is a popular Indian sweet consumed in West Bengal, India and Bangladesh. It is a light fried reddish-brown sweet ball made of Chhena and flour, soaked in sugar syrup. Ledikeni is named after Lady Canning, the wife of Charles Canning, the Governor General of India during 1856–62.

History 

The sweet originated in Kolkata in the middle of the 19th century. There are various legends regarding the origin of the sweet. According to the most popular legend, a special sweetmeat was prepared by Bhim Chandra Nag in the honour of Lady Canning at some point during her stay in India from 1856 till her death in 1861. In some versions of the tale, the sweetmeat was prepared to commemorate her visit to India in 1856, while in other versions, it was prepared on the occasion of her birthday. Some variations of the tale state that it became her favourite dessert, which she would demand on every occasion. According to yet another legend, the sweet was prepared by the confectioners of Baharampur in 1857, after the mutiny, to commemorate the visit by Canning and his wife.

Lady Canning died in 1861. Since then the sweetmeat has gained popularity in Bengal. No grand feast was considered complete if the sweetmeat was not offered to the guest. The manufacturer was said to have made a lot of money by selling the sweetmeat although some have claimed that its popularity is due to the name rather than the taste. As it gained popularity, the sweetmeat came to be known as "Lady Canning" which gradually got corrupted to "ledikeni".

A sweet very similar to the modern pantua and ledikeni, but made of rice flour, is mentioned in the 12th century Sanskrit-language text Manasollasa.

See also 
 Pantua
 Gulab Jamun

References 

Indian desserts
Sweets of West Bengal